Otávio Jordão da Silva Cantanhede, a 20-year-old Brazilian amateur football referee, was lynched, beheaded and quartered by football spectators after he stabbed a player to death in a match he officiated on 30 June 2013.

Incident
On 30 June 2013, da Silva was refereeing an amateur football match in Pio XII, Maranhão. He sent off player Josemir Santos Abreu, 31, who refused to leave the field and began a fight with the referee. Abreu threw a punch, which prompted da Silva to draw a knife from his pocket and repeatedly stab Abreu. Abreu died on the way to the hospital. When fans watching the game, including Abreu's friends and family, found out about his death, they invaded the pitch and stoned the referee, before decapitating him, quartering him, and putting his head on a stake in the pitch. Police chief Valter Costa was quoted as saying "one crime will never justify another".

Suspects
One suspect was arrested. However, police were searching for two more people, including Abreu's brother.

Video
A graphic video surfaced online shortly following the incident that shows medical personnel reassembling Otávio's body.

See also
List of unsolved murders

References

2013 in Brazilian football
Association football hooliganism
Brazilian football referees
Brazilian murderers
Male murder victims
People murdered in Brazil
Unsolved murders in Brazil
Year of birth missing